Conus saragasae is a species of sea snail, a marine gastropod mollusk in the family Conidae, the cone snails and their allies.

Like all species within the genus Conus, these snails are predatory and venomous. They are capable of "stinging" humans, therefore live ones should be handled carefully or not at all.

Description
The size of the shell varies between 18 mm and 25 mm. The shell is conical, with a short, scarcely stepped spire. The pattern consists of three bands of reddish-brown with a few white dots; the upper one is on the shoulder. Between these bands appear others of the same color but reticulated with white. Shell up to 30 mm.

Distribution
Only known from the west coast of São Vicente and the south coast of Santa Luzia. It is a Capverdian endemic and a species at high risk of extinction.

References

 Tucker J.K. & Tenorio M.J. (2009) Systematic classification of Recent and fossil conoidean gastropods. Hackenheim: Conchbooks. 296 pp. 
  Puillandre N., Duda T.F., Meyer C., Olivera B.M. & Bouchet P. (2015). One, four or 100 genera? A new classification of the cone snails. Journal of Molluscan Studies. 81: 1–23

External links
 The Conus Biodiversity website
 Cone Shells – Knights of the Sea
 

saragasae
Gastropods described in 1986
Gastropods of Cape Verde
Endemic fauna of Cape Verde
Fauna of São Vicente, Cape Verde
Santa Luzia, Cape Verde